The 51st Bodil Awards ceremony was held in 1998 in Copenhagen, Denmark, honouring the best national and foreign films of 1997. Let's Get Lost directed by Jonas Elmer won the award for Best Danish Film.

Winners

Bodil Honorary Award 
Joachim Holbek

See also 
 Robert Awards

References

External links 
 Official website

1997 film awards
1998 in Denmark
Bodil Awards ceremonies
1990s in Copenhagen